Te Pikinga  (fl. 1819–1834) was a notable New Zealand tribal leader. Of Māori descent, she identified with the Ngāti Apa iwi. She was active from about 1819.

References

Year of birth missing
1834 deaths
Ngāti Apa people